Phlegmariurus nutans, synonym Huperzia nutans, known as wawaeiole or nodding clubmoss, is a species of club moss in the family Lycopodiaceae. It is endemic to wet forests and cliffside shrublands on the islands of Oahu and Kauai in Hawaii. It is threatened by habitat loss.

References

nutans
Plants described in 1944
Endemic flora of Hawaii
Critically endangered plants
Taxonomy articles created by Polbot